The Botanischer Garten Bielefeld (4 hectares) is a municipal botanical garden located beside the southeast edge of the Teutoburger Wald at Am Kahlenberg 16, Bielefeld, North Rhine-Westphalia, Germany. It is open daily without charge.

The garden was established in 1912 on one hectare. It was enlarged in 1914–1915 with the installation of the alpine garden containing about 500 different plant species, and in 1925-1927 enlarged again by a further 2.5 hectares to the west for its rhododendron collection. By 1952 it contained about 3000 species.

Today the garden contains about 2500 plant varieties. Its highlights include a rhododendron and azalea collection, alpine garden, medicinal and herb garden, heather garden, flora of the Buchenwald region, and a half-timbered house dating from 1823.

See also 
 List of botanical gardens in Germany

External links 
 Botanischer Garten Bielefeld
 Map pamphlet (German)

Bielefeld, Botanischer Garten
Bielefeld, Botanischer Garten